Andrey Kuvaev (born 8 June 1983, in Dzerzhinsk) is a Russian Paralympic footballer who won a silver medal at the 2008 Summer Paralympic Games in China.

References

External links
 

1983 births
Living people
Paralympic 7-a-side football players of Russia
Paralympic silver medalists for Russia
Paralympic bronze medalists for Russia
Paralympic medalists in football 7-a-side
7-a-side footballers at the 2004 Summer Paralympics
7-a-side footballers at the 2008 Summer Paralympics
Medalists at the 2004 Summer Paralympics
Medalists at the 2008 Summer Paralympics
People from Dzerzhinsk, Russia
Sportspeople from Nizhny Novgorod Oblast
21st-century Russian people